Sheets Island (sometimes also referred to as Shutts Island) is an island located in the Susquehanna River beside the city of Harrisburg, Pennsylvania. It has much smaller surrounding islands, all of which comprise the Sheets Island Archipelago (3,675 acres). This land is open to the public and considered a Natural Area by the Pennsylvania Department of Conservation and Natural Resources, within the Weiser State Forest District. Other major nearby islands in the river outside of the archipelago are McCormick Island, Independence Island, and Governor’s Mansion Island.

References

Geography of Harrisburg, Pennsylvania
River islands of Pennsylvania
Landforms of Dauphin County, Pennsylvania
Islands of the Susquehanna River in Pennsylvania
Islands of Pennsylvania
Pennsylvania state forests
Protected areas of Dauphin County, Pennsylvania